Volow (formerly known as Valuwa or Valuga) is an Oceanic language variety which used to be spoken in the area of Aplow, in the eastern part of the island of Motalava, in Vanuatu.

Name 
The name Volow is originally a placename: it corresponds to the area known as Aplow, but in the local language Volow rather than in Mwotlap. This form, pronounced , is derived from Proto-Torres-Banks *βaluwa. 

In neighboring Mwotlap, the same area is called Aplow  (with locative prefix a-), and in Mota, it is called Valuwa . Both of these are nowadays used as alternative names for the area.

Sociolinguistics
Volow has receded historically in favour of the now dominant language Mwotlap. It is now only remembered by a single passive speaker, who lives in the village of Aplow — the new name of what was previously known as Volow.

The similarity of Volow with Mwotlap is such that the two communalects may be considered dialects of a single language.

Phonology
Volow phonemically contrasts 16 consonants and 7 vowels.

Consonants
{| class="wikitable" style="text-align:center"
|+ Consonants
!colspan="2"|
! Labiovelar
! Bilabial
! Alveolar
! Dorsal
! Glottal
|-
!colspan="2"| Nasal
|  
|  
|  
|  
|
|-
!rowspan="2"| Stop
! voiceless
|
|
|  
|
|
|-
! prenasalized
|  
|  
|  
|  
|
|-
!colspan="2"| Fricative
|
|  
|  
|  
|  
|-
!colspan="2"| Approximant
|  
|
|  
|  
|
|}

This consonant inventory includes a typologically rare consonant: a rounded, prenasalised voiced labial-velar plosive : e.g.  “woman” (spelled n-leq̄evēn in the local orthography).  

Historically, Volow is the only daughter language to have preserved the voicing of the proto-phonemes *ᵑg > /ᵑɡ/ and *ᵐbʷ > /ᵑᵐɡ͡bʷ/, which is reconstructed for its ancestor Proto-Torres-Banks. Most of its neighbours (including Mwotlap) devoiced these to /k/ and /k​͡pʷ/ respectively.

Vowels
The seven vowels of Volow are all short monophthongs: 

{| class="wikitable" style="text-align:center"
|+ Vowels
!
! Front
! Back
|-
!Close
|  
|  
|-
!Near-close
|  
|  
|-
!Open-mid
|  
|  
|-
!Open
| colspan="2"|  
|}

External links
 Presentation of the Volow language, by linguist A. François. Access to the Volow corpus (Pangloss Collection of CNRS).
 A story in Volow presented in bilingual (Volow–French) format, with audio recording (Pangloss Collection of CNRS). This story was recorded by anthropologist Bernard Vienne in 1969 from the last fluent speaker Wanhand [†1986], and was translated by A. François in 2003, with the help of Wanhand's son.

Notes

References

 .

 

Banks–Torres languages
Languages of Vanuatu
Torba Province
Endangered Austronesian languages
Critically endangered languages